Long Before Our Mothers Cried is an album by American saxophonist Sonny Fortune recorded in 1974 and released on the Strata-East label.

Reception
In The Village Voice, Robert Christgau gave Long Before Our Mothers Cried a "B+" and admired Fortune's "commitment to plain good music", spanning bebop to free jazz styles, and wrote of the album, "despite even the bracing piano comps of Stanley Cowell, there's nothing compelling here. But satisfying." Michael G. Nastos of AllMusic gave it three out of five stars, calling it "a fully realized creative album and very listenable as well".

Track listing
All compositions by Sonny Fortune
 "Long Before Our Mothers Cried" - 14:25
 "A Tribute to a Holiday (Billie)" - 5:51
 "Sound of Silents" - 8:41
 "Five for Trane" - 6:26
 "Wayneish" - 6:37

Personnel
Sonny Fortune - alto saxophone, soprano saxophone, flute
Charles Sullivan - trumpet
Stanley Cowell - piano, electric piano
Wayne Dockery - bass
Chip Lyle - drums
Mario Muñoz - bass drum, timbales
Angel Allende - congas, triangle, tambourine
Richie Pablo Landrum - percussion

References

Strata-East Records albums
Sonny Fortune albums
1974 albums